Gilbert Désiré Joseph Bachelu (9 February 1777 – 16 June 1849) was a French division commander during the Napoleonic Wars. In 1795 he graduated from the artillery and engineering school and was posted to the Army of the Rhine, serving in the Rhine Campaign of 1796. He fought in the French campaign in Egypt and Syria and then went on the Saint-Domingue expedition in 1802. He received command of an infantry regiment and fought at Austerlitz in 1805. He led a brigade in the Dalmatian Campaign and at Wagram in 1809. He was besieged and captured at Danzig in 1813. He joined Napoleon during the Hundred Days and led a division at Quatre Bras and Waterloo in 1815. Imprisoned for a time by the Bourbon Restoration he won election to the Chamber of Deputies in 1830. He died of cholera in 1849.

References

1777 births
1849 deaths
French generals
Commandeurs of the Légion d'honneur
French military personnel of the French Revolutionary Wars
French commanders of the Napoleonic Wars
Members of the Chamber of Deputies of the Bourbon Restoration
People from Jura (department)
Deaths from cholera
Names inscribed under the Arc de Triomphe
 Infectious disease deaths in France